Neurergus kaiseri, the  Luristan newt, Kaiser's mountain newt, Kaiser's spotted newt or emperor spotted newt (not to be confused with Tylototriton shanjing), is a species of very colourful salamander in the family Salamandridae. It is endemic to the southern Zagros Mountains in Iran where it is known from just four streams. Populations of this newt have been declining and the International Union for Conservation of Nature has rated it as "vulnerable". A captive breeding programme has been established in several zoos.

Distribution and habitat
The Luristan newt is endemic to the southern Zagros Mountains in Iran. It is primarily found in highland streams surrounded by arid scrubland, but can also be found in ponds and pools. Water is absent from its habitat for a significant part of the year and it moves out into the surrounding woodland which is predominantly oak and pistachio, during which time this species is known to estivate.

Currently the Luristan newt is found in the Zagros Mountains in Iran, but in recent studies it has been concluded that small portions of southern Iran that include Kermanshah, Ilam,  Chaharmahal-Bakhtiari, and Kohgiluye-Boyerahmad are habitats that these species will be distributing themselves in the future due do climate change affecting their current habitats.

Conservation
It is considered vulnerable due to its limited and fragmented range (inhabits an area of less than 10,000  km2), continuing habitat loss, and the illegal capture of salamanders for the wild animal trade. In 2008, the wild population was estimated at less than 1000 individuals. However, a new survey in 2014 estimates a population of over 9,000 adults, and range estimate that could provide habitat for more than 40,000 Neurergus kaiseri.

International trade require a permit, as the Luristan newt is listed on CITES Appendix I. It also has a captive breeding program involving several European and North American zoos, such as Sedgwick County Zoo. Iran is planning on starting its own breeding program.

Captive care 
These animals are often sold as captive bred (CB) animals. They are hardy animals under the right conditions. Three adults can easily live in a twenty-gallon terrarium, and should be offered both large amounts of land and water, as these species rarely visit water until the breeding season, as they live in a dry area. If keeping them terrestrial, they should be offered a good, but fairly dry top-soil, or coconut fiber, many live plants, and many hiding places.

Feeding is simple, as these newts are very hardy animals in captivity, and love to eat. Good feeders include Earthworms/Canadian night-crawlers, live and thawed blackworms, live and thawed blood-worms, calcium dusted pinhead crickets, the occasional waxworm, and various other insects. Insects collected outside should be avoided as they might introduce pesticides or parasites.

References

External links
 
Luristan newt. ARKive. Accessed 2008-09-27.
Neurergus kaiseri. Caudata Culture. Accessed 2008-09-27.
Neurergus kaiseri Encyclopedia of Life Listing

kaiseri
Endemic fauna of Iran
Amphibians of Iran
Taxa named by Karl Patterson Schmidt
Amphibians described in 1952
Taxonomy articles created by Polbot